The Emigrant Wilderness of Stanislaus National Forest is a wilderness area in the Sierra Nevada. It is bordered by Yosemite National Park on the south, the Toiyabe National Forest and the Hoover Wilderness on the east, and State Route 108 over Sonora Pass on the north. Watersheds drain to the Stanislaus and Tuolumne Rivers.

The Emigrant Wilderness is a glaciated landscape of scenic beauty. The northeastern third of the Wilderness is dominated by volcanic ridges and peaks; the remaining areas consist of many sparsely vegetated, granitic ridges interspersed with numerous lakes and meadows. Precipitation averages  annually, 80% of it in the form of snow. Snowpacks typically linger into June, sometimes later following very wet winters. Summers are generally dry and mild, but afternoon thundershowers occur periodically and nighttime temperatures could dip below freezing anytime.

History
Various native peoples occupied this area for 10,000 years, spending the summer and early autumn hunting in the high country and trading with groups from the eastern side of the Sierra Nevada. The most recent groups were the Sierra Miwok of the western slope and Piute of the Great Basin.

Following the discovery of gold in 1848, large numbers of miners and settlers came to the Sierra and the native cultures quickly declined. In September–October 1852, the Clark-Skidmore party became the first emigrant group to travel the West Walker route over Emigrant Pass, continuing through a portion of the present-day Emigrant Wilderness. Several more emigrant parties were enticed by officials from Sonora to use this route in 1853, but it was a very difficult passage with many hardships and was soon abandoned. Relief Valley and Relief Reservoir were so named because of the assistance some emigrants received there from residents of the Sonora area.

In 1931, the United States Forest Service designated this area for primitive management as the Emigrant Basin Primitive Area. On January 4, 1975, the Emigrant Basin Primitive Area was designated as the Emigrant Wilderness.

Dam Controversy
Since 1975, 18 small dams in the Emigrant Wilderness have been the source of an unresolved political debate. The dams were constructed by anglers who tightly stacked nearby stones and boulders. Some support proposals to maintain the dams while others feel the dams should be allowed to decay in keeping with the Wilderness Act.  A decision by the Stanislaus National Forest to compromise and leave some dams to naturally deteriorate while allowing maintenance of others was overturned in court in 2006, reigniting some of the controversy.  The Forest Service chose not to appeal and the dams will gradually disappear.

Recreation
From Sonora Pass in the north, the Pacific Crest Trail follows a scenic route at the east edge of the Emigrant Wilderness along the high ridge past Leavitt Peak, turns further east from Kennedy Canyon to Bond Pass, and then heads south down Jack Main Canyon.
Many other trails criss-cross the Emigrant Wilderness, from Leavitt Meadow on the East side, Kennedy Meadow on the West side, and other trailheads.  Highlights include cliffs in the Granite Dome area and lakes such as Emigrant Lake, Huckleberry Lake, and Lake Lertoria.

References

External links 
 
 Wilderness.net
 TopoQuest map

Protected areas of the Sierra Nevada (United States)
Protected areas of Tuolumne County, California
Wilderness areas of California
Stanislaus National Forest